Touko Tumanto (born 6 March 1982) is a Finnish professional football player.

Tumanto has played many places in different teams. He is known for his versatile style of playing. Middlefielder is his strongest position.

References
Guardian Football

Finnish footballers
Veikkausliiga players
FC Inter Turku players
JJK Jyväskylä players
Living people
1982 births
Association football midfielders
Footballers from Helsinki